Cork City Park railway station was on the Cork, Blackrock and Passage Railway in County Cork, Ireland.

History

The station opened on 1 June 1885.

Passenger services were withdrawn on 1 September 1889.

Routes

Further reading

References

Disused railway stations in County Cork
Railway stations opened in 1885
Railway stations closed in 1889